The 1988 NHL Supplemental Draft was the third NHL Supplemental Draft. It was held on June 10, 1988.

Selections by round

Round one
The first round was limited to teams that missed the 1988 Stanley Cup playoffs.

Round two

See also
1988 NHL Entry Draft
1988–89 NHL season
List of NHL players

References

External links
 1988 NHL Supplemental Draft player stats at The Internet Hockey Database

Draft
1988